Full Moon in Blue Water is a 1988 film directed by Peter Masterson. It stars Gene Hackman and Teri Garr.

Plot
Floyd owns a bar called the Blue Water Grill in a town of that name on an island off the gulf coast of Texas. He has lost interest in almost everything in the year since the mysterious disappearance of his wife, neglecting his business and staying home to watch old home movies of their life.

Floyd's father-in-law, known to all as the General, uses a wheelchair and is trapped in the throes of dementia. An intellectually disabled local man called Jimmy comes by to look after the General at times when Floyd can't be there.

Into their lives comes Louise, a school bus driver who is falling for Floyd and trying to get him to come out of his stupor. Land opportunists are trying to seize his property and taxes need to be paid. With the troubles piling up, Floyd is eventually forced to confront his future.

Cast
 Gene Hackman as Floyd
 Teri Garr as Louise Taylor
 Burgess Meredith as The General
 Elias Koteas as Jimmy
 Kevin Cooney as Charlie O'Donnell
 David Doty as Virgil
 Gil Glasgow as Baytch
 Becky Gelke as Dorothy
 Marietta Marich as Lois
 Lexie Masterson as Annie Gorman
 Mark Walters as Johnny Gorman
 Ben Jones as Digby
 Tiny Skaggs as Stranger #1
 Bill Johnson as Stranger #2

Filmed in Seabrook, Texas

References

External links

1988 films
Films directed by Peter Masterson
1988 comedy-drama films
American comedy-drama films
1980s English-language films
1980s American films